Caliente may refer to:

Music
 Caliente (Calle Ciega album), 2000
 Caliente (Vox Dei album)
 "Caliente" (Dyland & Lenny song)
 "Caliente" (Inna song), 2012
 "Caliente" (Jay Santos song), 2012
 "Caliente" (Lali song), 2018
 Caliente, 1997 album by Willie & Lobo

Places 
 Caliente, California, United States
 Caliente, Nevada, United States
 Ojo Caliente Spring, a hot spring in Yellowstone National Park
 Caliente Mountain, in the Southern Coast Ranges of California
 Caliente Range, a west–east trending zone of uplift mountains in the Pacific Coast Ranges, in central California

Other
 Caliente, an alternative name for the Kawaiisu, an ethnic group of the Southwestern United States
 Caliente (TV series), a popular Spanish-language television show on Univision that aired from 1995 to 2006
 Caliente (Sirius XM), a Latin American music station on XM Satellite Radio
 Casino Caliente a chain of casinos in Baja California and other states of Mexico
 Jiggly Caliente, Filipino-American drag queen
 Miami Caliente, a Lingerie Football League team
 USS Caliente (AO-53), a Cimarron-class fleet oiler built during World War II for the U.S. Navy
 Caliente (dish), a Moroccan street food dish

See also 
 
 Hot (disambiguation)
 Agua Caliente (disambiguation) ("Hot Springs")
 King Kaliente, a character from the video game Super Mario Galaxy